Manfred "Manni" Schmidt (born 27 November 1964) is a German heavy metal guitarist, best known for having been a member of Grave Digger and Rage.

History 
Born in Andernach, West Germany, Schmidt begun his career starting his own band Factor 6. However, the heavy metal band Rage had noticed Schmidt and his skills with the guitar, so in 1987, he was asked to become a member of that band. He joined and become a member of the trio and released many albums with them. In 1994, he quit the band. His first son was born in 1997, the second in 2003.

In 2000, another door was opened for him, when guitarist Uwe Lulis left German heavy metal band, Grave Digger, their bassist Jens Becker suggested Schmidt as a replacement, remained with them until October 2009.

In early 2010, Schmidt formed his own band, Capital Joke.

Discography

With Rage 
Perfect Man (1988)
Invisible Horizons (single) (1989)
Secrets in a Weird World (1989)
Reflections of a Shadow (1990)
Extended Power (EP) (1991)
Beyond the Wall (EP) (1992)
Trapped! (1992)
Refuge (Japan) (1993)
The Missing Link (1993)
The Video Link (1994)

With Jack of Hearts 
Welcome to Heartland (demo) (1993)

With Grave Digger 
The Grave Digger (2001)
Tunes of Wacken (live CD + DVD) (2002)
Rheingold (2003)
The Last Supper (2005)
25 To Live (live CD + DVD) (2005)
Yesterday (EP) (2006)
Silent Revolution (single) (2006)
Liberty or Death (2007)
Pray (EP) (2008)
Ballads of a Hangman (2009)

References

External links 
 Manni Schmidt at Myspace
 Capital Joke at Myspace

1964 births
Living people
German songwriters
German heavy metal guitarists
German male guitarists
Rage (German band) members